Questamation, released on Mar 9, 2009, is the first full-length semi-programmed album by Canadian band Ubiquitous Synergy Seeker, alias USS, consisting of Ashley Boo-Schultz on guitar and vocals, and Jason Parsons, aka Human Kebab, on turntables and programming. For the recording, USS teamed up with Matthew Wagner (Crystal Castles, Alpha Galates) for production and engineering, as well as with Chris Davies and Charles Topping who 'aided musically'.

“It’s going to be our hello to the world,” says Parsons.

Laces Out

Laces Out is USS' first single off Questamation. Released on February 10, 2009, it was soon aired on multiple radio stations, including 102.1 The Edge, which earlier had Hollowpoint Sniper Hyperbole in heavy rotation, inspiring USS to begin producing music videos for their more popular songs, such as 2 15/16ths.

The music video for Laces Out was shot mid-March 2009. It was directed by Jon Knautz and produced by Brookstreet Pictures, along with LifeForce Entertainment.

Track listing

Reviews
 CD Review: USS Questamation

References 

2009 debut albums
Ubiquitous Synergy Seeker albums